Bahram Kalhornia (1952) is an Iranian contemporary artist and art critic. He was born in 1952 in Kermanshah in a Kurdish family who belonged to the Kalhor tribe. His undergraduate and graduate studies were in the fields of drawing, sculpture, graphics, and illustration, respectively. During the Iran-Iraq war, he moved to Kermanshah in 1985, where he taught in a newly opened Visual Art High school of Kermanshah for three years.

He is currently a member of the Faculty of Art and Architecture of Islamic Azad University, Tehran Center Branch, and the IRIB University. He is also the secretary and board member of the Iranian Graphic Designers Society, and a member of the Graphic Book Writing Council. He is also a consultant to the National Museum of Iran.

His teaching method involves using artworks, spiritual works, philosophy, and psychology. In his works, he draws inspiration from ancient Iranian myths, and the concept of good and evil is widely reflected in his works. Therefore, some critics consider him the William Blake of Iran. He is considered one of notable representative of Iranian poetic painting.

He has been teaching and working in graphic design and art since 1972 and has brought new ideas to the system. He had a profound influence on at least two generations of Iranian artists.
Kermanshah Graphic Designers Association awarded him the statue of Sarv Mordad in 2011 for his efforts in developing graphic art in Iran.

After 2018 Sarpol-e Zahab earthquake, a center of culture and art for children was established and named after Bahram Kalhernia.

Kalhornia is currently preparing a documentary series on the history and culture of Iran for the Radio and Television, which takes a fresh look at the lesser-known aspects of Iranian culture and archeology (Cultural Iran). Among the prepared series, "Kufic script and its visual and cultural value" and "Taq-e Bostan reliefs" we can mention.

He had a solo exhibition in 2017 and four group exhibitions between 2017 and 2019.

He said in an interview about his artworks in the Suspicion's share exhibition: In this exhibition, I put mirrors in front of my visitors so that other parts of their existence can be found. If we put aside the external cover, there is something else inside us. An army of horsemen and warriors lurks inside me. Inside another, wayfarers lurk, and inside another, a legendary bird sings. Life has blocked the expression of these creatures. We don't see hidden ourselves and we close our ears to the voice of our own storytellers. I awakened these and showed the viewer to see that these also reside within him/her. When several people like the same work, I notice what interesting things they have in common. I realize that the hidden entity and archetypal entity of people can become sensitive and proud in front of these drawings. This is important to me.

The fact of the matter is that the subjects of these works were not suddenly found and existed before me. The world is an eternal phenomenon and I only have a short chance to experience a small slice of existence. The eternal existence flows in me. I lived in a different way, both in the awe of my cosmic existence and in the awe of my personal life. I studied well, I lived well, I used the resources of existence well and I was blessed with the blessings of the world. I believe that every person has several other people inside him/her; The creatures that are lurking under the cover of his face and are supposed to wake up at any moment and take charge of an issue. If anyone looks at him/her from morning to evening, he/she can understand the changes in his/her behavior. A person is constantly changing and this change is connected to the creatures that are placed in us

An art critic wrote about his works displayed in the solo exhibition "Suspicion's share": "This time Bahram Kalhornia appears on his life scene in an astonishing image; Kalhornia as a great and capable drawer. This time, the skilled sculptor of our time is exhibiting a collection of unconventional drawings that neither I nor any of us had seen and were unaware of, in A Gallery of Tehran. The power of the hand in the drawing is to engage the audience with highly influential and evocative combinations and themes that blend between ancient myths and powerful contemporary icons in an attempt to instill a new concept in the artistic expression".

Solo exhibition 
 2017 - Suspicion's share, Gallery A, Tehran

Group exhibitions 
 2017 - Poetical, Passing of Dream, Laleh Gallery, Tehran 
 2018 - Drawing as Living, Iranian Artists Forum Gallery, Tehran 
 2019 - Woman+Man, Vard Gallery, Tehran 
 2019 - From demon to angel to good to evil to black to white to color! In the twilight of fantasy and legend, Vard Gallery, Tehran

Books 
 Mousavi Jazayeri, Seyed Mohammad Vahid, Ghelichkhani, Hamid Reza, Kalhornia, Bahram, 2013. From Kufic Inscriptions to Contemporary Typography Steps towards a comprehensive Farsi Script, https://kuficpedia.org/ 
 Kalhornia, Bahram, 2014. The mother of the full moon, the father of the whole sun. in the occasion of the children's week, National Museum of Iran, Tehran.
 Kalhornia, Bahram, 2017. Suspicion's share'', selected artworks, A Gallery, Tehran.

References 

Iranian painters
Contemporary painters
Iranian graphic designers
Iranian art critics
Living people
Iranian contemporary artists
Iranian art writers
21st-century Iranian people
1952 births
People from Kermanshah
Iranian biographers